Cyrillic refers to the Cyrillic script. It may also refer to:
 Early Cyrillic alphabet, used for Old Church Slavonic
 Any of the Cyrillic alphabets, language specific alphabets based on the Cyrillic script
 Cyrillic (Unicode block), one of the Unicode blocks with Cyrillic characters

Music
 Cyrillic (album), 2010 jazz album